Mount Kaplan is a massive mountain, the highest in the Hughes Range of Antarctica, standing 5 km (3 mi) southeast of Mount Wexler.

The mountain was discovered and photographed by Admiral Byrd on the Baselaying Flight of November 18, 1929, and surveyed by A.P. Crary in 1957–58. Crary named it for Joseph Kaplan, the chairman of the U.S. National Committee for the IGY, 1957–58.

References 

Mountains of the Ross Dependency
Queen Maud Mountains
Dufek Coast
Four-thousanders of Antarctica